St Ann's Chapel is a village in the parish of Calstock, Cornwall, England, United Kingdom. It is west of Gunnislake on the A390 between Tavistock and Liskeard.

References

Hamlets in Cornwall